Sean E. McCance, M.D., is an American orthopedic surgeon and Co-Director of Spine Surgery in the Leni and Peter W. May Department of Orthopaedics at the Mount Sinai Medical Center in New York City. Additionally, he is Associate Clinical Professor of Orthopaedics at the Mount Sinai School of Medicine and Attending Spine Physician at Lenox Hill Hospital.

McCance is the author of a chapter in Athletic Training and Sports Medicine and was listed as one of the "Best Doctors" for spinal fusion in Money Magazine. He is a member of both the Scoliosis Research Society and the North American Spine Society.

Biography
McCance received his B.S. in 1987 from Fordham University and his M.D.  in 1991 from Columbia University College of Physicians and Surgeons. He completed an internship in general surgery at the Strong Memorial Hospital in Rochester, New York in 1992 and a residency at the University of Rochester Medical Center in 1996. He completed a fellowship in spine surgery at the Twin Cities Spine Center in Minneapolis in 1997.

In 1997, McCance was named Coordinator of Spine Education and Assistant Adjunct of Orthopaedic Surgery at Lenox Hill Hospital in New York City. In 2000, he was named Clinical Assistant Professor at New York University School of Medicine and Attending Orthopedic Surgeon at NYU Medical Center. In 2000, he joined the Mount Sinai Medical Center as Attending Orthopedic Surgeon. In 2006, he was named Co-Director of Spine Surgery at Mount Sinai, and, in 2008, Clinical Associate Professor at the Mount Sinai School of Medicine.

McCance is a member of the Scoliosis Research Society, the North American Spine Society, the American Academy of Orthopaedic Surgeons, the American Medical Association and the Medical Society of the State of New York. Clinical interests include long-term outcomes of instrumented lumbar fusions for degenerative disease, innovative surgical techniques for spinal stenosis and cervical spine fixation techniques.

Honors and awards
1986, Phi Beta Kappa
1996, Resident-Fellow Research Award, Eastern Orthopaedic Association
2003, “Best Doctors”, Money Magazine, 2003
2005, 2006 “America's Top Physicians”

Publications
Sorin A, Voigt EP, McCance SE, Rossi AM Jr, Lessow AS. Anterolateral approach to the lower cervical spine: a step-by-step description. Ear Nose Throat J. 2008 Jun 13;87(6):E12-5. Review.  
Parvataneni HK, Nicholas SJ, McCance SE. Bilateral pedicle stress fractures in a female athlete: case report and review of the literature. Spine (Phila Pa1976). 2004 Jan 15;29(2):E19-21.  
Poynton AR, Nelson MC, McCance SE, Levine RL, O'Leary PF. Bovine thrombin induces an acquired coagulopathy in sensitized patients undergoing revision spinal surgery: a report of two cases. Spine. 2003 Jun 15;28(12):E221-3.  
Mathews V, McCance SE, O'Leary PF. Early fracture of the sacrum or pelvis: an unusual complication after multilevel instrumented lumbosacral fusion. Spine. 2001 Dec 15;26(24):E571-5.  
O'Leary PF, McCance SE. Distraction laminoplasty for decompression of lumbar spinal stenosis. Clin Orthop Relat Res. 2001 Mar;(384):26-34.  
McCance SE, Smith MD. Respiratory arrest after anterior cervical discectomy and arthrodesis in a patient with Down syndrome. A case report and review of the literature. J Bone Joint Surg Am. 1999 Dec;81(12):1741-3.  
McCance SE, Winter RB, Lonstein JE. A King type II curve pattern treated with selective thoracic fusion: case report with 44-year follow-up. J Spinal Disord.1999 Jun;12(3):262-5.  
McCance SE, Denis F, Lonstein JE, Winter RB. Coronal and sagittal balance in surgically treated adolescent idiopathic scoliosis with the King II curve pattern. A review of 67 consecutive cases having selective thoracic arthrodesis. Spine. 1998 Oct 1;23(19):2063-73.  
McCance SE, DelSignore JL. Chronic displaced medial epicondyle fracture.Orthopedics. 1998 Aug;21(8):904-6.  
Totterman SM, Miller RJ, McCance SE, Meyers SP. Lesions of the triangular fibrocartilage complex: MR findings with a three-dimensional gradient-recalled-echo sequence. Radiology. 1996 Apr;199(1):227-32.

References

External links
Dr. Sean McCance Website
Mount Sinai Hospital homepage
Mount Sinai School of Medicine homepage
Expert Q&A: Treatment Options for Herniated Discs Sean McCance at qualityhealth.com

Fordham University alumni
Columbia University Vagelos College of Physicians and Surgeons alumni
Icahn School of Medicine at Mount Sinai faculty
American orthopedic surgeons
Year of birth missing (living people)
Living people